
Year 824 (DCCCXXIV) was a leap year starting on Friday (link will display the full calendar) of the Julian calendar.

Events 
 By place 

 Europe 
 November 11 – The Constitutio Romana establishes the authority of the Holy Roman Emperors over the papacy of Rome.
 Battle of Roncevaux Pass: The Basques and Banu Qasi defeat a Frankish expedition, led by Counts Aznar and Ebles, in the Pyrenees.
 Iñigo Arista revolts against the Frankish Empire, and establishes the Kingdom of Pamplona, with the support of the Caliphate of Córdoba.
 Viking raids in Ireland on the Kingdom of Munster at Skellig Michael

 Britain 
 Vikings raid Bangor (modern Wales) for the second time, and plunder the bishopric (approximate date).

 Central America 
March 3 – Juun Tsak-Took and Ti-Chaak become the co-rulers of the Mayan city state of Machaquila in Guatemala after the death of Sihyaj K'in Ich’aak II, and reign until Juun's death in 840.

 Japan 
 Zenpuku-ji, one of the oldest Tokyo temples, is founded by the Japanese Buddhist monk Kūkai.

 By topic 

 Religion 
 February 11 – Pope Paschal I dies after a 7-year reign, and is succeeded by Eugene II, as the 99th pope of the Catholic Church.

Births 
 Al-Tirmidhi, Persian scholar and hadith compiler (d. 892)
 Chen Tao, Chinese poet (d. 882)
 Ibn Majah, Persian scholar and hadith compiler
 Li Pu, prince of the Tang Dynasty (d. 828)
 Muhammad ibn Abdallah, Muslim governor (or 825)
 Zhao Chou, Chinese warlord (d. 889)

Deaths 
 February 11 – Paschal I, pope of the Catholic Church
 March 5 – Suppo I, Frankish nobleman
 August 5 – Heizei, emperor of Japan (b. 773)
 Adelard, duke of Spoleto (Italy)
 Han Yu, Chinese philosopher and poet (b. 768)
 Mauring, Frankish nobleman
 Mu Zong, emperor of the Tang Dynasty (b. 795)
 Óengus of Tallaght, Irish bishop 
 Ruthmael, Irish abbot and bishop
 Sayyida Nafisa, Arab female scholar (b. 762)
 Wetti of Reichenau, German scholar
 Zhang Hongjing, Chinese chancellor (b. 760)

References